In the theory of computation and automata theory, the powerset construction or subset construction is a standard method for converting a nondeterministic finite automaton (NFA) into a deterministic finite automaton (DFA) which recognizes the same formal language. It is important in theory because it establishes that NFAs, despite their additional flexibility, are unable to recognize any language that cannot be recognized by some DFA. It is also important in practice for converting easier-to-construct NFAs into more efficiently executable DFAs. However, if the NFA has n states, the resulting DFA may have up to 2n states, an exponentially larger number, which sometimes makes the construction impractical for large NFAs.

The construction, sometimes called the Rabin–Scott powerset construction (or subset construction) to distinguish it from similar constructions for other types of automata, was first published by Michael O. Rabin and Dana Scott in 1959.

Intuition
To simulate the operation of a DFA on a given input string, one needs to keep track of a single state at any time: the state that the automaton will reach after seeing a prefix of the input. In contrast, to simulate an NFA, one needs to keep track of a set of states: all of the states that the automaton could reach after seeing the same prefix of the input, according to the nondeterministic choices made by the automaton. Therefore, the sets of reachable NFA states play the same role in the NFA simulation as single DFA states play in the DFA simulation, and in fact the sets of NFA states appearing in this simulation may be re-interpreted as being states of a DFA.

Construction
The powerset construction applies most directly to an NFA that does not allow state transformations without consuming input symbols (aka:  "ε-moves").

However, many states of the resulting DFA may be useless as they may be unreachable from the initial state. An alternative version of the construction creates only the states that are actually reachable.

NFA with ε-moves
For an NFA with ε-moves (also called an ε-NFA), the construction must be modified to deal with these by computing the ε-closure of states: the set of all states reachable from some given state using only ε-moves. Van Noord recognizes three possible ways of incorporating this closure computation in the powerset construction:

 Compute the ε-closure of the entire automaton as a preprocessing step, producing an equivalent NFA without ε-moves, then apply the regular powerset construction. This version, also discussed by Hopcroft and Ullman, is straightforward to implement, but impractical for automata with large numbers of ε-moves, as commonly arise in natural language processing application.
 During the powerset computation, compute the ε-closure  of each state  that is considered by the algorithm (and cache the result).

Multiple initial states
If NFAs are defined to allow for multiple initial states, the initial state of the corresponding DFA is the set of all initial states of the NFA, or (if the NFA also has ε-moves) the set of all states reachable from initial states by ε-moves.

Example
The NFA below has four states; state 1 is initial, and states 3 and 4 are accepting. Its alphabet consists of the two symbols 0 and 1, and it has ε-moves. 

The initial state of the DFA constructed from this NFA is the set of all NFA states that are reachable from state 1 by ε-moves; that is, it is the set {1,2,3}.
A transition from {1,2,3} by input symbol 0 must follow either the arrow from state 1 to state 2, or the arrow from state 3 to state 4. Additionally, neither state 2 nor state 4 have outgoing ε-moves. Therefore, ({1,2,3},0) = {2,4}, and by the same reasoning the full DFA constructed from the NFA is as shown below.

As can be seen in this example, there are five states reachable from the start state of the DFA; the remaining 11 sets in the powerset of the set of NFA states are not reachable.

Complexity

Because the DFA states consist of sets of NFA states, an -state NFA may be converted to a DFA with at most  states. For every , there exist -state NFAs such that every subset of states is reachable from the initial subset, so that the converted DFA has exactly  states, giving Θ() worst-case time complexity. A simple example requiring nearly this many states is the language of strings over the alphabet {0,1} in which there are at least  characters, the th from last of which is 1.

Applications
Brzozowski's algorithm for DFA minimization uses the powerset construction, twice. It converts the input DFA into an NFA for the reverse language, by reversing all its arrows and exchanging the roles of initial and accepting states, converts the NFA back into a DFA using the powerset construction, and then repeats its process. Its worst-case complexity is exponential, unlike some other known DFA minimization algorithms, but in many examples it performs more quickly than its worst-case complexity would suggest.

Safra's construction, which converts a non-deterministic Büchi automaton with  states into a deterministic Muller automaton or into a deterministic Rabin automaton with 2O( log ) states, uses the powerset construction as part of its machinery.

References

Further reading
 

Finite automata